The 2014 Junior Pan American Rhythmic Gymnastics Championships was held in Daytona Beach, United States, May 9–11, 2014.

Medal summary

References

2014 in gymnastics
Pan American Gymnastics Championships
International gymnastics competitions hosted by the United States
2014 in American sports